Rawang, also known as Krangku, Kiutze (Qiuze), and Ch’opa, is a Sino-Tibetan language of India and Burma.

Rawang has a high degree of internal diversity, and some varieties are not mutually intelligible. Most, however, understand Mutwang, the basis of written Rawang.

Rawang is spoken in Putao District, northern Kachin State, in Putao, Machanbaw, Naungmaw, Kawnglangphu, and Pannandin townships (Ethnologue). Alternate names are Chiutse, Ch’opa, Ganung-Rawang, Hkanung, Kiutze, Nung, Nung Rawang, and Qiuze.

Varieties
The Ethnologue lists the following varieties of Rawang.
Daru-Jerwang (including the Kunglang variety spoken in Arunachal Pradesh)
Khrangkhu/Thininglong (Southern Lungmi) (documented in Shintani 2018)
Kyaikhu (Dangraq-Mashang, Northern Lungmi)
Matwang
Tangsar East (Changgong)
Tangsar West (Langdaqgong, Renyinchi)
Thaluq

Lungmi varieties of Mashang and Dangraq are especially divergent, and varieties spoken near the Tibetan border are also divergent.

Kyaikhu Lungmi and Changgong Tangsar are less intelligible with the standard written variety of Matwang.

There are 4 major Rawang clan divisions, in addition to subclans (Ethnologue):
Lungmi
Matwang
Daru-Jerwang
Tangsar

Dvru (Daru) dialects include Malong, Konglang, Awiqwang, and Rvmøl. Tangsar is spoken to the east of Rvmøl, and Waqdamkong and Mvtwang to the south of Rvmøl. Rvmøl-speaking clans include Ticewang/Tisanwang/Ticvlwang/Chicvlwang, Abør, Chømgunggang, Chvngdvng, Dvngnólcv̀l/Dvngnóycv̀l, Dvlìnv̀m.

Wadamkhong is a Rawang dialect recently documented by Shintani (2014).

Straub (2017) provides demographic details and phoneme inventories for the following Rawang dialects.
Dvrù dialect: spoken by the Rvwàng, Konglang, and Sangnay clans, and was originally spoken on the upper Rvmetì (N'mai Hka) river north of Konglangpø. It is also spoken in Nokmong, Putao District, Kachin State, Myanmar.
Rvmø̀l Rvwàng: a southern Dvrù dialect originally spoken north of Konglangpø, Putao District, Kachin State, Myanmar. It is geographically and linguistically transitional between the western Dvngsar, Waqdvmkong (northern Mvtwàng), and Dvrù dialects.
Krvngku dialect: spoken in southern Lungmi, Rvwàng, from Rv́zà village (no longer existent since the mid-1960s). The village was located on the upper Krang stream, an eastern tributary of the Mvliq river in Kachin State, Myanmar.
Western Dvngsar (Tangsar) dialect: spoken by the Mvpáng clan. It was originally spoken along the upper Renyinchi and Langdaqgong streams north of Konglangpø, Putao District, Kachin State, Myanmar.

Tadahiko Shintani has also documented the Wadamkhong and Khwingsang dialects.

References

External links

DaruWeb (Rawang language site)
Rawang language site
Kagvbu news (Rawang language news)
Dinglag (Northern Lungmi language site)

Nungish languages